Manan Trivedi (born May 22, 1974) is an American physician, politician, Iraq War veteran and perennial candidate.

Early life, education and career
Trivedi was born and raised in Fleetwood, Pennsylvania, and was the valedictorian at his high school. He went to Boston University for college and medical school, completing a master's degree in Public Policy at UCLA. He is currently employed as a board-certified doctor of internal medicine at The Reading Hospital and Medical Center in West Reading, Pennsylvania. Before running for Congress, Trivedi served as a Health Care Advisor to the Obama for America campaign. He has served as President of the National Physicians Alliance since 2016.

Military service 
During the Iraq War, Trivedi served as a battalion surgeon with the United States Marine Corps as a navy officer. He earned the Combat Action Ribbon, the Navy Commendation Medal, and his unit was awarded the Presidential Unit Citation.

Congressional elections

2010

In the May 18, 2010 primary election, Trivedi defeated journalist Doug Pike and Lower Merion Commissioner Brian Gordon by 672 votes.

Trivedi lost to Republican Congressman Jim Gerlach in the general election on November 2, 2010, by 57% to 43%

2012

Trivedi won the Democratic nomination for  again in 2012. He received the endorsement of Democracy for America, and was selected as one of their Dean Dozen. In the general election, he was again defeated by Gerlach, by the same margin, 57% to 43%.

2014

On January 6, 2014, Gerlach announced that he would not run for re-election. He faced Republican Ryan Costello in the general election and was defeated by 56% to 44%.

Political positions
Manan Trivedi is pro-choice, supports providing tax incentives to businesses for job creation, supports federal regulations of greenhouse gases, opposes repealing the Affordable Care Act, opposes requiring illegal immigrants to return to their country of origin before they are eligible for citizenship, and opposes privatizing social security.

Personal life
Trivedi and his wife, Surekha, reside in Birdsboro, Pennsylvania.

References

External links
Manan Trivedi for U.S. Congress official campaign site

1974 births
Living people
American Hindus
United States Navy personnel of the Iraq War
American politicians of Indian descent
American surgeons
Boston University School of Medicine alumni
Candidates in the 2010 United States elections
Pennsylvania Democrats
People from Birdsboro, Pennsylvania
United States Navy Medical Corps officers
University of California, Los Angeles alumni
Candidates in the 2012 United States elections
Candidates in the 2014 United States elections
21st-century American politicians